Love 'em and Weep is a 1927 American silent comedy short film starring Mae Busch, Stan Laurel and James Finlayson.

Opening Title 
Ancient Proverb—Every married man should have his fling—But be careful not to get flung too far.

Plot
An old flame (Mae Busch) of businessman Titus Tillsbury (James Finlayson) threatens to expose their past, destroying both his marriage and career. He sends his aide (Stan Laurel) to keep her away from a dinner party he and his wife are hosting that evening.

Cast

Production
Love 'em and Weep was filmed in January 1927 and released June 12 of that year by Pathé Exchange.

Notes
 Since Laurel and Hardy appear in the film, it is considered an early Laurel and Hardy film despite the fact that Hardy's role is a bit part and they barely share any scenes in the film.
 The film was the first in which English character actor Charlie Hall was to appear with Laurel and Hardy.

Remake
Love 'em and Weep was remade in 1931 as Chickens Come Home, with both Mae Busch and Stan Laurel reprising their roles. James Finlayson played the butler this time, replacing Charlie Hall, with Oliver Hardy taking on Finlayson's original role.

References

External links 
 
 
 

1927 films
1927 comedy films
American silent short films
American black-and-white films
Films directed by Fred Guiol
Laurel and Hardy (film series)
Films with screenplays by H. M. Walker
1927 short films
American comedy short films
1920s American films
Silent American comedy films